Malo Crniće is a village and municipality located in the Braničevo District of eastern Serbia. In 2011, the population of the village is 719, while population of the municipality is 11,422.

Settlements
Aside from the village of Malo Crniće, the municipality consists of the following villages:

Demographics

Economy
The following table gives a preview of total number of employed people per their core activity (as of 2017):

References

External links 

 Malo Crniće
 Facebook

Populated places in Braničevo District
Municipalities and cities of Southern and Eastern Serbia